Jabalpur is one of the most important cities for Tourism in Madhya Pradesh and Central India . it is the third-largest urban agglomeration in Madhya Pradesh and the country's 37th-largest urban agglomeration. The world-renowned tiger reserves like Kanha National Park, Bandhavgarh National Park, and Pench National Park can be easily visited via Jabalpur. Because of connectivity through all the major metro cities in India, the Jabalpur City has always been preferred as a gateway for wildlife tours in Central India. 

Some of the important tourist attractions in Jabalpur include:
 Dhuandhar Falls and Marble Rocks in Bhedaghat, the most famous tourist destination in Jabalpur.
 Chausath Yogini Temple, Jabalpur
 Madan Mahal, a fort said to be built by the Gond king Madansahi in 1116 atop a balancing rock.
 Rani Durgawati Museum, built in 1964 to commemorate Rani Durgavati. The museum hosts ancient relics and sculptures, as well as a collection of items related to the life of Mahatma Gandhi.
 Dumna Nature Reserve Park
 Bargi Dam
Gwarighat
Tilwara ghat
Tripur Sundari Temple
Lameta Ghat
Ghughra Falls
Dashmesh Dwar
Jilhari Ghat
Bajnamath Mandir

Gallery

References

 
Jabalpur
Jabalpur